Adolf Koxeder (born 9 October 1934) is an Austrian bobsledder who competed in the 1960s. He won a silver medal in the four-man event at the 1964 Winter Olympics in Innsbruck.

Koxeder also won a bronze medal in the four-man event at the 1963 FIBT World Championships in Igls.

References
 Bobsleigh four-man Olympic medalists for 1924, 1932-56, and since 1964
 Bobsleigh four-man world championship medalists since 1930
 DatabaseOlympics.com profile

1934 births
Sportspeople from Innsbruck
Austrian male bobsledders
Bobsledders at the 1964 Winter Olympics
Living people
Olympic bobsledders of Austria
Olympic silver medalists for Austria
Olympic medalists in bobsleigh
Medalists at the 1964 Winter Olympics